English Boy Wonders is the second studio album by the English progressive rock band, Big Big Train. It was released in 1997 by Giant Electric Pea.

Track listing

Re-release
In February 2008, it was announced on Big Big Train's BlogSpot that English Boy Wonders was going to be re-recorded and partially re-mixed.
It was re-released on the band's new record label, English Electric, on 1 December 2008.

The re-release adds one track and changes the running order.

"Big Empty Skies" – 4:23	
"Brushed Aside" – 5:40	
"Albion Perfide" – 10:27	
"Pretty Mom"  – 3:43	
"A Giddy Thing"  – 5:17	
"Out of It"  – 6:02	
"Cloudless and Starry and Still"  – 3:36	
"Two Poets Meet" (Spawton) – 4:26 (Re-issue Bonus Track)
"28 Years" – 2:28	
"Reaching for John Dowland" – 8:46	
"Boxgrove Man" – 7:23	
"The Shipping Forecast"  – 10:14	
"Right to the End of the World Tra-La"  – 2:03	
"Fell Asleep"  – 3:59

 Tracks 3-7 are grouped as For Autumn (Parts 1-5) and tracks 12-14 as For Autumn (Parts 6-8).

Personnel
Martin Read – lead vocals
Gregory Spawton – guitars, backing vocals, additional keyboards
Tony Müller – keyboards, piano
Andy Poole – bass, backing vocals, additional keyboards
Steve Hughes – drums, percussion

Guest musicians
Ken Bundy – backing vocals

References

Big Big Train albums
1997 albums
2008 albums